Cithas or Kithas was a town of Chalcidice in ancient Macedonia. It belonged to the Delian League since it appears in the tribute registry of Athens for the year 434/3 BCE, where it paid a phoros of 3000 drachmas jointly with the cities of Tinde, Gigonus, Smila and Lisaea.

The location of its site is disputed: the editors of the Barrington Atlas of the Greek and Roman World treat Cithas as located at the site of Cissus; whereas, Mogens Herman Hansen and his colleagues treat Cithas as unlocated.

Accepting the identification, its site is located in the western Chalcidice.

References

Populated places in ancient Macedonia
Former populated places in Greece
Geography of ancient Chalcidice
Members of the Delian League